Farny State Park is a  state park located in Rockaway Township in Morris County, New Jersey in the United States. It is operated by the New Jersey Division of Parks and Forestry.

See also

 List of New Jersey state parks
 List of New Jersey wildlife management areas

References

External links

 Farny State Park (official website)

Parks in Morris County, New Jersey
Rockaway Township, New Jersey
State parks of New Jersey